Nilamani Routray()(24 May 1920 – 4 October 2004) was an Indian politician and the Chief Minister of Odisha from 1977 to 1980. He served as the Health and Family Welfare Minister and then Forest and Environment Minister in the Union Government led by V.P. Singh. He died on 4 October 2004.

Political career
Nilamani Routray was a founder of the Odisha unit of All India Students Federation. He was the president of the Odisha state unit of the Indian National Congress from 1967 to 1970. Later he joined the Utkal Congress and became its president. Subsequently, he switched over to the Bharatiya Lok Dal and became the president of its state unit. He was elected to the Lok Sabha in 1989.

Works
His autobiography Smruti O Anubhuti (1986) won the Odisha Sahitya Akademi Award in 1988.

References

Chief Ministers of Odisha
1920 births
2004 deaths
Deputy chief ministers of Odisha
People from Balasore district
India MPs 1989–1991
Lok Sabha members from Odisha
Rajya Sabha members from Odisha
Ravenshaw University alumni
Chief ministers from Janata Party
Indian National Congress politicians
Janata Party politicians
Janata Dal politicians
People from Puri district
Utkal Congress politicians
Bharatiya Lok Dal politicians
Odisha MLAs 1977–1980
Indian National Congress politicians from Odisha
Writers from Odisha
Odia-language writers
Recipients of the Odisha Sahitya Akademi Award